Illaphanus is a genus of ground beetles in the family Carabidae. There are more than 30 described species in Illaphanus.

Species
These 31 species belong to the genus Illaphanus:

 Illaphanus annani Giachino, 2005
 Illaphanus brittoni Giachino, 2005
 Illaphanus calderi Giachino, 2005
 Illaphanus chiarae Giachino, 2005
 Illaphanus cooki Giachino, 2005
 Illaphanus endeavouri Giachino, 2005
 Illaphanus eungellae Giachino, 2005
 Illaphanus gillisoni Giachino, 2005
 Illaphanus hanni Giachino, 2005
 Illaphanus lawrencei Giachino, 2005
 Illaphanus lordhowei Giachino, 2005
 Illaphanus mallacootae Giachino, 2005
 Illaphanus matthewsi Giachino, 2005
 Illaphanus montanus Giachino, 2005
 Illaphanus monteithi Giachino, 2005
 Illaphanus montislewisi Giachino, 2005
 Illaphanus moorei Giachino, 2005
 Illaphanus newtoni Giachino, 2005
 Illaphanus norfolkensis Giachino, 2005
 Illaphanus nothofagi Giachino, 2005
 Illaphanus oakviewensis Baehr, 2018
 Illaphanus pecki Giachino, 2005
 Illaphanus pteridophyticus Giachino, 2005
 Illaphanus stephensii W.J.MacLeay, 1865
 Illaphanus thayeri Giachino, 2005
 Illaphanus thompsoni Giachino, 2005
 Illaphanus toledanoi Giachino, 2005
 Illaphanus victoriae Giachino, 2005
 Illaphanus walfordi Baehr, 2018
 Illaphanus weiri Giachino, 2005
 Illaphanus windsori Giachino, 2005

References

Trechinae